Wandsworth, Newfoundland and Labrador was a settlement located southwest of Burin. It had a population of 91 in 1956.

See also
 List of communities in Newfoundland and Labrador

Populated places in Newfoundland and Labrador